The Oriental Mindoro Disiplinados are a professional basketball team competing in the Maharlika Pilipinas Basketball League (MPBL).

They also played as the Mindoro Tamaraws Disiplinados in the National Basketball League.

History
The Mindoro Tamaraws, backed by 7A Sports and with Justin Tan as the team owner joined the Maharlika Pilipinas Basketball League making its debut in the 2019–20 season.

In April 2020, actress and Pola, Oriental Mindoro mayor Ina Alegre became co-owner of the team. The Tamaraws were also recognized as the representative team of Oriental Mindoro in the MPBL, and a basketball court in Calapan was built to serve as the team's homecourt.

In 2021, a second team dubbed as the Mindoro Tamaraws Disiplinados was formed for the National Basketball League which is meant to a more homegrown-oriented team as opposed to the MPBL team which is intended to be the "showcase team".

Current roster

Season-by-season records
Records from the 2022-23 MPBL season:

References

Maharlika Pilipinas Basketball League teams
National Basketball League (Philippines) teams